Mount Fijelvingue is a mountain in Equatorial Guinea. At 1500 metres above sea level, it is the highest point of the central plateau that occupies the inland of the country's mainland.

References 

Volcanoes of Equatorial Guinea